The architecture of Barcelona has had a parallel evolution to that of the rest of the Catalan and Spanish architecture, and has followed in diverse ways the multiple trends that have been produced in the context of the history of Western architecture. Throughout its history, Barcelona has welcomed various cultures and civilizations, which have contributed their concept of art and have left their legacy for posterity, from the first Iberian settlers, through the Roman colonizers, the Visigoths, and a brief Islamic period, until the emergence in the Middle Ages of Catalan art, language and culture, in which the Romanesque and Gothic were very fruitful periods for the artistic development of the region.

History
During the Modern Age, when the Barcelona City was linked to the Hispanic Monarchy, the main styles were the Renaissance and the Baroque, developed from foreign styles coming from Italy and France. These styles were applied with various local variants, and although some authors claim that it was not a particularly splendid period, the quality of the works was in line with that of the state as a whole.

The nineteenth century led to a certain economic and cultural revitalization, which reflected in one of the most fruitful periods in the city's architecture, Modernisme. Until the nineteenth century, Barcelona was corseted by its walls of medieval origin, being considered a military place, so its growth was limited. The situation changed with the demolition of the walls and the donation to the city of the Parc de la Ciutadella, which led to the expansion of the city along the adjoining plain, a fact that was reflected in the Eixample project designed by Ildefonso Cerdá. This was the largest territorial expansion of Barcelona. Another significant increase in the area of the city was the annexation of several bordering municipalities between the late nineteenth and early twentieth centuries. All this meant the adaptation of the new urban spaces and an increase in municipal artistic commissions on public roads, which were also favored by various events held in the city such as the Universal Exhibition of 1888 and the International of 1929 or, more recently, for the Olympic Games of 1992 and the Universal Forum of the Cultures of 2004.

The twentieth century began with the updating of the various styles produced by Barcelonian architects, which connected with international currents. The architectural development in recent years and the commitment to design and innovation, as well as the link between urban planning, ecological values, and sustainability, have turned Barcelona into one of the most cutting-edge European cities in the architectural field, which has been recognized with numerous awards and distinctions such as the Royal Gold Medal of the Royal Institute of British Architects (RIBA) in 1999 and the prize of the Venice Biennale in 2002.

The architectural heritage of the city enjoys a special protection in virtue of the Law 9/1993 of the Catalan Cultural Heritage, that guarantees the protection, conservation, research and diffusion of the cultural heritage, with several degrees of coverage: level To (Cultural Good of National Interest), level B (Cultural Good of Local Interest), level C (Good of Interest Urbanístic) and level D (Good of Documentary Interest).

Location 
Barcelona, capital of the autonomous community of Catalonia, is found  in the Spanish Levante, on the coast Mediterranean. It is situated in a plain about 5 km wide, bordered by the sea and the saw of Collserola – with the peak of the Tibidabo (516,2 m) as a point higher – as well as the deltas of the rivers Besòs and Llobregat. Above the coastline and separating the city of the delta of the Llobregat is  mountain of Montjuïc (184,8 m). Likewise, since the sight of Collserola advance  to the flat several hills that follow a parallel line to the littoral sight: they are the hills of the Peira (133 m), the Rovira (261 m), the Carmel (267 m), the Creueta of the Neck (249 m), the Putget (181 m) and Monterols (121 m).[5]

Antiquity

Prehistory 

There is scarce vestiges of prehistoric period to the city. If well it is ascertained the human presence in the paleolithic, the first rests regarding the architecture proceed of the neolíthic, period in which the human being went back  sedentary and happened of a subsistència based in the hunting and the recol·lecció to an agrarian economy and farmer. These first vestiges proceed of finals of the neolític (3500 - 1800 BC), and manifest  mainly for the practices funeràries with sepulcres of pit, that were used to be of quite a lot depth and revestides of slabs. An exponent thereof is the grave discovered the 1917 to the spilling southwest of the hill of Monterols, between the streets of Muntaner and Copèrnic; of imprecise dating, has 60 cm of high and 80 of wide, and was formed by slabs flat of irregular shape. Regarding habitacles, of this period only has found  a bottom of cabin in what is the current station of Saint Andreu Comtal.

Of the Bronze Age (1800–800 BC) there is equally few rests regarding the plan of Barcelona. The main proceed of a jaciment discovered the 1990 to the street of Saint Pau, where have found  rests of fireplaces and sepultures of inhumació individual. Also they are surely of this period the rests found the 1931 to Can Casanoves, behind the Hospital of Saint Pau, where have found  rests of walls of stone and the bottoms of three circular cabins of some 180 cm of diameter. They exist for other band witnesses written of two megalithic monuments, situated in Montjuïc and Field of the Harp, of those that nevertheless has not remained any rastre material. Finally, of the calcolític final there are some scarce rests of the called «culture of the fields of urns», found to the farm of Can Don Joan, to Horta, and to the south slope-oriental of the mountain of Montjuïc, between the paths of the Ancient Mill and the Source of the Mamella.

Iberian period 

In the 6th century BC and the 1st century BC the plan of Barcelona was occupied by the Laietani, an Iberian people that occupied the current comarques of the Barcelonès, the Vallès, the Maresme and the Bass Llobregat. The Iberian architecture based  in murs of tapial, with a system adovellat, with false arches and turns realised by approach of spun. Cities used to be located in acropolis, with towers and solid walls for the defence, within which the houses were located, of an irregular distribution, generally with a rectangular plan.

In Barcelona there are hardly any Iberian architectural remains; the main vestiges of this culture were found in the hills of La Rovira, Peira and Putget, as well as in Santa Cruz de Olorde in Tibidabo, but they have not allowed establishing special characteristics with regard to funeral homes or sepulchres. The main remains come from Rovira, where in 1931 vestiges of an Iberian settlement were found that were destroyed when anti-aircraft batteries were installed during the Spanish Civil War. Apparently, it had a wall with two accesses, while located outside the walls there was a set of silos with 44 deposits carved into the rock.

The main Iberian settlement in the area was in Montjuïc, possibly the 'Barkeno', although the urbanization of the mountain in recent years and its intensive use as a stone quarry throughout the history of the city has caused the loss of most remains. In 1928, nine large capacity silos were discovered in the Magòria area, which would probably be part of an agricultural surplus warehouse. On the other hand, in 1984 remains of a settlement were found on the southwest slope of the mountain, on a plot of about 2 or 3 hectares.

Roman period 

In the third century BC C. the Romans arrived in the Iberian peninsula and began a colonization process that culminated in the incorporation of all Hispania into the Roman Empire. In the 1st century BC Barcino (Roman Barcelona) was founded, a small walled town that took the urban form of castrum and later oppidum. The Romans were great experts in civil architecture and engineering and provided roads, bridges, aqueducts and cities with a rational layout and basic services such as sewers.

The Barcino quarter was walled, with a perimeter of 1.5 km, which protected an area of 10.4 hectares. The first city wall, of simple factory, began to be built in the 1st century BC. It had few towers, only at the angles and at the gates of the walled perimeter. However, the first incursions of francs and Alamani from the 250s raised the need to reinforce the walls, which were extended in the fourth century. The new wall was built on the bases of the first, and was formed by a double wall of 2 metres, with space in half filled with stone and mortar. The wall consisted of 74 towers about 18 meters high, mostly rectangular.

See also 

 Urban planning of Barcelona

Notes

References 
 DDAA. Art de Catalunya 3: Urbanisme, arquitectura civil i industrial.  Barcelona: Edicions L'isard, 1998. 
 DDAA. Arte contemporáneo.  Barcelona: Folio, 2006. 
 DDAA. Barcelona. Guia de la ciutat.  Barcelona: Ajuntament de Barcelona, 2002. 
 DDAA. El llibre d'or de l'art català.  Barcelona: Edicions Primera Plana, 1997.
 DDAA. Els Barris de Barcelona I. Ciutat Vella, L'Eixample.  Barcelona: Gran Enciclopèdia Catalana, 1999. 
 DDAA. Enciclopèdia Catalana Bàsica.  Barcelona: Enciclopèdia Catalana, 1996.
 DDAA. Gaudí. Hàbitat, natura i cosmos.  Barcelona: Lunwerg, 2001. 
 DDAA. Història de Barcelona 1. La ciutat antiga.  Barcelona: Enciclopèdia catalana, 1991. 
 DDAA. Història de Barcelona 2. La formació de la Barcelona medieval.  Barcelona: Enciclopèdia catalana, 1992. |
 DDAA. Història de Barcelona 6. La ciutat industrial (1833-1897).  Barcelona: Enciclopèdia catalana, 1995. 
 DDAA. Història de l'art català.  Barcelona: Edicions 62, 2005. 
 DDAA. Sagnier. Arquitecte, Barcelona 1858-1931.  Barcelona: Antonio Sagnier Bassas, 2007. 
 Albert de Paco, José María. El arte de reconocer los estilos arquitectónicos.  Barcelona: Optima, 2007. 
 Añón Feliú, Carmen; Luengo, Mónica. Jardines de España.  Madrid: Lunwerg, 2003. 
 Azcárate Ristori, José María de; Pérez Sánchez, Alfonso Emilio; Ramírez Domínguez, Juan Antonio. Historia del Arte.  Madrid: Anaya, 1983. 
 Bahamón, Alejandro; Losantos, Àgata. Barcelona. Atlas histórico de arquitectura.  Barcelona: Parramón, 2007. 
 Baldellou, Miguel Ángel; Capitel, Antón. Summa Artis XL: Arquitectura española del siglo XX.  Madrid: Espasa Calpe, 2001. 
 Barjau, Santi. Enric Sagnier.  Barcelona: Labor, 1992. 
 Barral i Altet, Xavier; Beseran, Pere; Canalda, Sílvia; Guardià, Marta; Jornet, Núria. Guia del Patrimoni Monumental i Artístic de Catalunya, vol. 1.  Barcelona: Pòrtic, 2000. 
 Bassegoda i Nonell, Joan. Gaudí o espacio, luz y equilibrio.  Madrid: Criterio, 2002. 
 Bergós i Massó, Joan. Gaudí, l'home i l'obra.  Barcelona: Lunwerg, 1999. 
 Chilvers, Ian. Diccionario de arte.  Madrid: Alianza Editorial, 2007. 
 Corredor-Matheos, Josep. Història de l'art català vol. IX. La segona meitat del segle XX.  Barcelona: Edicions 62, 2001. 
 Crippa, Maria Antonietta. Gaudí.  Köln: Taschen, 2007. 
 Dalmases, Núria de; José i Pitarch, Antoni. Història de l'art català III. L'art gòtic, s. XIV-XV.  Barcelona: Edicions 62, 1998. 
 Fernández Polanco, Aurora. Fin de siglo: Simbolismo y Art Nouveau.  Madrid: Historia 16, 1989. DL M. 32415-1989.
 Flores, Carlos. Les lliçons de Gaudí.  Barcelona: Ed. Empúries, 2002. 
 Fontbona, Francesc. Història de l'art català VI. Del neoclassicisme a la Restauració 1808-1888.  Barcelona: Edicions 62, 1997. 
 Fontbona, Francesc; Miralles, Francesc. Història de l'art català VII. Del modernisme al noucentisme 1888-1917.  Barcelona: Edicions 62, 2001. 
 Gabancho, Patrícia. Guía. Parques y jardines de Barcelona.  Barcelona: Ajuntament de Barcelona, Imatge i Producció Editorial, 2000. 
 Galofré, Jordi. Historia de Catalunya.  Barcelona: Primera Plana, 1992.
 Garriga, Joaquim. Història de l'art català IV. L'època del Renaixement, s. XVI.  Barcelona: Edicions 62, 1986. 
 Garrut, Josep Maria. L'Exposició Universal de Barcelona de 1888.  Barcelona: Ajuntament de Barcelona, Delegació de Cultura, 1976. 
 Gausa, Manuel; Cervelló, Marta; Pla, Maurici. Barcelona: guía de arquitectura moderna 1860-2002.  Barcelona: ACTAR, 2002. 
 Giorgi, Rosa. El siglo XVII.  Barcelona: Electa, 2007. 
 González, Antonio Manuel. Las claves del arte. Últimas tendencias.  Barcelona: Planeta, 1991. 
 Grandas, M. Carmen. L'Exposició Internacional de Barcelona de 1929.  Sant Cugat del Vallès: Els llibres de la frontera, 1988. 
 Hernàndez i Cardona, Francesc Xavier. Barcelona, Història d'una ciutat.  Barcelona: Llibres de l'Índex, 2001. 
 Huertas, Josep Maria; Capilla, Antoni; Maspoch, Mònica. Ruta del Modernismo.  Barcelona: Institut Municipal del Paisatge Urbà i la Qualitat de Vida, Ajuntament de Barcelona, 2005. 
 Lacuesta, Raquel; González, Antoni. Barcelona, guía de arquitectura 1929-2000.  Barcelona: Gustavo Gili, 1999. 
 Lacuesta, Raquel; González, Antoni. Guía de arquitectura modernista en Cataluña.  Barcelona: Gustavo Gili, 1997. 
 Lecea, Ignasi de; Fabre, Jaume; Grandas, Carme; Huertas, Josep M.; Remesar, Antoni Art públic de Barcelona.  Barcelona: Ajuntament de Barcelona i Àmbit Serveis Editorials, 2009. 
 Maspoch, Mònica. Galeria d'autors. Ruta del Modernisme de Barcelona.  Barcelona: Institut Municipal del Paisatge Urbà i la Qualitat de Vida, Ajuntament de Barcelona, 2008. 
 Midant, Jean-Paul. Diccionario Akal de la Arquitectura del siglo XX.  Madrid: Akal, 2004. 
 Miralles, Francesc. Història de l'art català VIII. L'època de les avantguardes 1917-1970.  Barcelona: Edicions 62, 2001. 
 Miralles, Roger. Barcelona, arquitectura modernista y noucentista 1888-1929.  Barcelona: Polígrafa, 2008. 
 Miralles, Roger; Sierra, Pau. Barcelona, arquitectura contemporánea 1979-2012.  Barcelona: Polígrafa, 2012. 
 Montaner, Josep Maria. Arquitectura contemporània a Catalunya.  Barcelona: Edicions 62, 2005. 
 Navascués Palacio, Pedro. Summa Artis XXXV-II. Arquitectura española (1808-1914).  Madrid: Espasa Calpe, 2000. 
 Páez de la Cadena, Francisco. Historia de los estilos en jardinería.  Madrid: Istmo, 1998. 
 Permanyer, Lluís. Biografia del Passeig de Gràcia.  Barcelona: La Campana, 1994. .
 Pla, Maurici. Catalunya. Guia d'arquitectura moderna 1880-2007.  Sant Lluís (Menorca): Triangle, 2007. 
 Roig, Josep L. Historia de Barcelona.  Barcelona: Primera Plana S.A., 1995. 
 Rubio, Albert. Barcelona, arquitectura antigua (siglos I-XIX).  Barcelona: Polígrafa, 2009. 
 Sánchez Vidiella, Àlex. Atlas de arquitectura del paisaje.  Barcelona: Loft, 2008. 
 Soler, Narcís; Guitart i Duran, Josep; Barral i Altet, Xavier; Bracons Clapés, Josep. Art de Catalunya 4: Arquitectura religiosa antiga i medieval.  Barcelona: Edicions L'isard, 1999. 
 Triadó, Joan Ramon; Barral i Altet, Xavier. Art de Catalunya 5: Arquitectura religiosa moderna i contemporània.  Barcelona: Edicions L'isard, 1999. 
 Triadó, Joan Ramon. Història de l'art català V. L'època del Barroc, s. XVII-XVIII.  Barcelona: Edicions 62, 1984. 
 Viladevall-Palaus, Ignasi. «Cincuenta parques, más dos». Cuadernos Cívicos La Vanguardia. La Vanguardia Ediciones [Barcelona], 3, 2004.
 Villoro, Joan; Riudor, Lluís. Guia dels espais verds de Barcelona. Aproximació històrica.  Barcelona: La Gaia Ciència, 1984.